Ante Roje (1 October 1905 – 15 December 1980) was a Croatian swimmer. He competed in two events at the 1924 Summer Olympics and the water polo at the 1936 Summer Olympics.

References

External links
 

1905 births
1980 deaths
Croatian male swimmers
Yugoslav male swimmers
Croatian male water polo players
Olympic swimmers of Yugoslavia
Olympic water polo players of Yugoslavia
Swimmers at the 1924 Summer Olympics
Water polo players at the 1936 Summer Olympics
Sportspeople from Split, Croatia